Macrocentrum is a genus of flowering plants belonging to the family Melastomataceae.

Its native range is Southern Tropical America.

Species
Species:

Macrocentrum andinum 
Macrocentrum anfractum 
Macrocentrum angustifolium 
Macrocentrum anychioides 
Macrocentrum brevipedicellatum 
Macrocentrum chimantense 
Macrocentrum cristatum 
Macrocentrum droseroides 
Macrocentrum fasciculatum 
Macrocentrum fruticosum 
Macrocentrum gesneriaceum 
Macrocentrum gracile 
Macrocentrum huberi 
Macrocentrum latifolium 
Macrocentrum longidens 
Macrocentrum maguirei 
Macrocentrum minus 
Macrocentrum neblinae 
Macrocentrum parvulum 
Macrocentrum repens 
Macrocentrum rubescens 
Macrocentrum steyermarkii 
Macrocentrum stipulaceum 
Macrocentrum vestitum 
Macrocentrum yaracuyense

References

Melastomataceae
Melastomataceae genera